Waccamaw High School (WHS) is one of four schools that are encompassed in the Waccamaw school family on the Waccamaw Neck of Georgetown County, South Carolina. Opening in 1990, it was a school that consisted of grades 7–11, with its first senior class being the class of 1992. In 1996, the first group of students who helped open the school as 7th grade middle schoolers graduated.

Sports 
 Swimming
 Baseball
 Basketball
 Cheerleading
 Cross Country
 Football
 Fishing
 Golf
 Lacrosse
 Marching Band
 Soccer
 Softball
 Tennis
 Track and Field
 Volleyball
 Wrestling

Clubs for 2021-22
Gaming
Speech and Debate
Mock Trial
Yoga
Intermurals
Finance
Prom
National Honors Society
Drama
Yearbook

References

Public high schools in South Carolina
Schools in Georgetown County, South Carolina